Elachista rubiginosae is a moth of the family Elachistidae which is endemic to Australia.

Larval host plants: Baumea rubiginosa (Spreng.) Boeck. ( Cyperaceae )

References

Moths described in 2011
Endemic fauna of Australia
rubiginosae
Moths of Australia
Taxa named by Lauri Kaila